

History

The Early Years

Yovee joined forces in 2003 as the result of a recording project, the soundtrack for Riding in Vans with Boys. Eight months later, they released their first EP, City Strollin, and began performing in front of sold-out crowds immediately. Yovee blends acoustic guitar, piano, and vocal harmonies with a modern chord progression, resulting in a lush sound influenced by a diverse mix of history... Young, Fleetwood Mac, the Beatles, Coldplay and Radiohead.

Yovee can be heard on several of San Diego's largest FM radio stations including 91X, 94.9, and 102.1. They have performed live on Fox, KUSI News, and received coverage in numerous print publications--Transworld Surf, San Diego Union-Tribune, North County Times, San Diego CityBeat, San Diego Reader, 944, and SD Music Matters Magazine.

Nominated in 2004 for Best New Artist and in 2005 for Best Pop Band in the San Diego Music Awards, Yovee has been a headlining act since day one and covered an amazing amount of ground in a relatively short period of time. The band was featured on the soundtrack of Drive Thru: South Central America by award-winning surf filmmaker Taylor Steele , and a three
song Yovee EP was included with every copy of the movie sold. Yovee's first music video for the song "Dreamer On The Run" debuted on a promotional DVD distributed nationwide by Macbeth Shoes and appeared in Atticus Clothing's 'Dragging the Lake Vol. 2' video magazine. Following the first video Yovee teamed up with Z-Media to shoot the "Private Caller" music video that is available online at sdmusicmatters.com. In 2005 Yovee released their first full length album on Manaloft Record's entitled Too Far Gone.

The band recorded tracks for their 3rd album, Praying for Fire EP, to be released October 2008. Yovee also had plans for a national tour that would have brought their music across the United States and then to Europe. As of May 2009, the members of Yovee have parted ways, but still continue other musical endeavors. Recently in 2010 and 2011, Yovee has been playing live shows in and around San Diego. This could be the sign of a possible reformation.

One Law Love

Yovee reconvened in May 2021 to write and record their new album, One Law Love, produced by longtime friend and musician, Isaiah Mitchell of Earthless and The Black Crowes.  They have also cowritten and recorded a song with Kris Kristofferson which is due out 2022.

Yovee continues to perform in and around San Diego with hopes to possibly tour in the near future.

Band members
Brandon Parkhurst - Vocals, lead guitar
Nell Blevins - Vocals, rhythm guitar
Cannon Kristofferson - Guitar
Steve Clark - Bass 
Frank Dixon - Drums

Alternative rock groups from California
Musical groups from San Diego
Musical groups established in 2003